The men's long jump field event at the 1960 Olympic Games took place on September 2. Forty-nine athletes from 34 nations competed. The maximum number of athletes per nation had been set at 3 since the 1930 Olympic Congress. The event was won by Ralph Boston of the United States, the nation's eighth consecutive and 13th overall victory in the men's long jump. Igor Ter-Ovanesyan's bronze was the Soviet Union's first medal in the event.

Background

This was the 14th appearance of the event, which is one of 12 athletics events to have been held at every Summer Olympics. The returning finalists from the 1956 Games were bronze medalist Jorma Valkama of Finland, fourth-place finisher Dmitriy Bondarenko of the Soviet Union, sixth-place finisher Kazimierz Kropidłowski of Poland, twelfth-place finisher Fermín Donazar of Uruguay, and Igor Ter-Ovanesyan of the Soviet Union, who had fouled in all three attempts in the 1956 final. Ralph Boston of the United States was favored; the month before the Games he had broken the 25-year-old world record set by Jesse Owens. Ter-Ovanesyan, the 1958 European champion, was his biggest challenger.

The British West Indies, Egypt, Iraq, Malaya, and New Zealand each made their first appearance in the event; Germany competed as the "United Team of Germany" for the first time. The United States appeared for the 14th time, the only nation to have long jumpers at each of the Games thus far.

Competition format

The 1960 competition used the two-round format with divided final introduced in 1952. The qualifying round gave each competitor three jumps to achieve a distance of 7.40 metres; if fewer than 12 men did so, the top 12 (including all those tied) would advance. The final provided each jumper with three jumps; the top six jumpers received an additional three jumps for a total of six, with the best to count (qualifying round jumps were not considered for the final).

Records

Prior to this competition, the existing world and Olympic records were as follows.

Ralph Boston broke the Olympic record with an 8.12 metre jump on his third attempt in the final. In his last jump, Bo Roberson also surpassed the old Olympic record but did not quite reach Boston's new record, jumping 8.11 metres.

Schedule

All times are Central European Time (UTC+1)

Results

All jumpers reaching 7.40 metres advanced to the finals. All distances are listen in metres.

Qualifying

Final

References

M
Long jump at the Olympics
Men's events at the 1960 Summer Olympics